The 1948–49 season was the 57th season in Liverpool F.C.'s existence, and ended with the club finishing twelfth in the table.

Goalkeepers

 Charlie Ashcroft
 Ray Minshull
 Cyril Sidlow

Defenders

 Joe Cadden
 Laurie Hughes
 Bill Jones
 Ray Lambert
 Bob Paisley
 Bill Shepherd
 Sam Shields
 Eddie Spicer
 Phil Taylor

Midfielders

 Ken Brierley
 Peter Kippax
 Billy Liddell
 Doug McAvoy
 Tommy McLeod
 Alex Muir
 Jimmy Payne
 Billy Watkinson
 Bryan Williams

Forwards

 Jack Balmer
 Kevin Baron
 Cyril Done
 Willie Fagan
 Les Shannon
 Albert Stubbins

Table

Results

First Division

FA Cup

References
 LFC History.net – 1948–49 season
 Liverweb - 1948–49 Season

Liverpool F.C. seasons
Liverpool